Norman Percy Mason (15 October 1914 – 17 November 1996) was an Australian rules footballer who played with South Melbourne in the Victorian Football League (VFL).

He later served in the Australian Army for six months in World War II.

Notes

External links 

1914 births
1996 deaths
Australian rules footballers from Victoria (Australia)
Sydney Swans players
Australian Army personnel of World War II